Heydarluy-e Beyglar (also Romanized as Ḩeydarlūy-e Beyglar; also known as Bīglar, Ḩeydarlū-ye Beyglar, and Ḩeydarlū-ye Bīglar) is a village in Nazlu-e Shomali Rural District, Nazlu District, Urmia County, West Azerbaijan Province, Iran. At the 2006 census, its population was 379, in 116 families.

References 

Populated places in Urmia County